The 2007–08 season was Inverness Caledonian Thistle's fourth in the Scottish Premier League and 14th since the merger that created the club. They also competed in the Scottish League Cup and the Scottish Cup.

Scottish Premier League 

Caley Thistle finished 9th of 12 teams in the SPL, on 43 points from 38 matches. They managed only a disappointing −11 goal differential, from 51 goals scored and 62 allowed. It was a mixed season for statistics, as this tied the club's record for goals scored in an SPL season, set in 2004–05, but also demolished their record for SPL goals conceded by 14. But overall, it could be called a poor season for the Caley, with the lowest total points and lowest finishing league standing since their promotion in 2004.

The exception to this poor form, and the main reason for the team's survival in the SPL, was the month of December. A streak that included wins against Hearts and Celtic earned Craig Brewster Manager of the Month and Marius Niculae Player of the Month honors.

Scottish Cup 

To go along with the lackluster league season was a short and poor Scottish Cup. Caley Thistle entered the tournament in the fourth round, and faced Hibernian at Easter Road. Dean Shiels scored a hat trick and sunk Caley's hopes for a cup run at the first possible point as the match finished 3–0 to Hibs.

League Cup 

The League Cup provided a bit more positive news for Caley Thistle fans, as the club reached the quarterfinals for the second time in three seasons, on the strength of a 4–1 win over Arbroath and a 3–0 win over Gretna. The run stopped abruptly, however, away to Aberdeen, who beat Caley Thistle 4–1 on the strength of another hat trick (albeit including two penalties), this time from Barry Nicholson.

Results
All the results of the regular matches

Scottish Premier League

Scottish League Cup

Scottish Cup

Club Records Set 
 (+) Tied - Most SPL goals scored: 51 (also scored 51 in 2004–05)
 (−) Lowest SPL finish: 9th (previous was 8th in 2004–05 and 2006–07)
 (−) Least SPL points: 43 (previous was 44 in 2004–05)
 (−) Worst SPL goal difference: −11 (previous was −6 in 2004–05 and 2006–07)
 (−) Most SPL goals allowed: 62 (previous was 48 in 2006–07)

Transfers In

Transfers Out

References

Inverness Caledonian Thistle F.C. seasons
Inverness Caledonian Thistle